Shi Lim (born 1988) is a Singaporean who won the title of Miss Singapore Universe 2013 and represented Singapore at the Miss Universe 2013 pageant. She also competed on the 5th season of Supermodel Me.

Education
Lim studied at New York University and graduated with a Bachelor of Arts in individualised study (specialising in cognitive science).

Pageant career

Miss Singapore Universe 2013
Lim was crowned Miss Universe Singapore 2013 at the conclusion of the event held on 6 July 2013 at the Shangri-La Hotel Singapore. The first runner-up was Cheryl Desiree Chan, a 23-year-old student and entrepreneur and the second runner-up was Cordelia Low, a 24-year-old events coordinator.

Miss Universe 2013
Lim represented Singapore at Miss Universe 2013 in Moscow, Russia but she was unplaced at the pageant.

Personal life 
Lim moved with her family to Canada in 2004 as her father was doing his Masters in Canada. They moved back to Singapore two years later when he finished his Masters.

References

External links
Official Miss Singapore Facebook

1989 births
Living people
Singaporean beauty pageant winners
Singaporean people of Chinese descent
Miss Universe 2013 contestants